Boston Common is a public park.

Boston Common may also refer to:

 Boston Common (TV series)
 Boston Common (quartet)
 Boston Common, 8/17/71, an album by the Allman Brothers Band